"Work That Magic" is a 1991 song from the album Mistaken Identity by Donna Summer. It was written by Summer, Keith Diamond, Eve Nelson, Anthony Smith and Larry Henley and produced by Diamond. The single was released on November 18, 1991, as the second and final single from the album by Atlantic Records and Warner Bros. Records (Europe). In some countries' editions of the album (including the UK), the version of the song was a remix by Ian Stanley. The edited version of the remix was used in the song’s music video. This version was released as a single in the UK (in place of "When Love Cries", which had been a single in America and Europe). While most of the album had quite an urban feel, this song was much more of a dance number. It peaked at number 74 in the UK Singles Chart.

Critical reception 
In their review of the Mistaken Identity album, Billboard described the song as "house-inflected" and picked it as a "worthy candidate" to follow up "When Love Cries".

Track listing 
 US 12" single (1991) Atlantic 0-85925
 "Work That Magic" (Extended ISA Remix) - 6:20
 "Work That Magic" (ISA Remix) - 5:00
 "Work That Magic" (Capricorn Remix) - 4:34
 "Let There Be Peace" (LP Version) - 3:59

 US 12" single (1991) WEA International Inc. U 5937T
 "Work That Magic" (Extended ISA Remix)
 "Work That Magic" (Capricorn ISA Remix)
 "Let There Be Peace"

 US 12" promo (1991) Atlantic DMD 1758
 "Work That Magic" (Extended ISA Remix) - 6:20
 "Work That Magic" (ISA Remix) - 5:00
 "Work That Magic" (Capricorn Remix) - 4:34
 "Let There Be Peace" (LP Version) - 3:59

 UK CD single (1991) Warner Bros. U5937CD
 "Work That Magic" (ISA Full Length Remix) - 5:00
 "This Time I Know It's for Real" - 3:36
 "Dinner With Gershwin" - 4:37
 "State of Independence" - 5:50

Chart performance

References

Donna Summer songs
1991 songs
1991 singles
Songs written by Donna Summer
Songs written by Keith Diamond (songwriter)
Atlantic Records singles
Warner Records singles